Castalia ambigua is a species of bivalve of the family Hyriidae described by Lamarck in 1819.

References

Hyriidae
Bivalves described in 1819
Taxa named by Jean-Baptiste Lamarck